Band-e Meyan is a village in Faragheh Rural District, in the Central District of Abarkuh County, Yazd Province, Iran. At the 2006 census, its population was 22, in 6 families.

References 

Populated places in Abarkuh County